Douglas Edwin Moe (born September 21, 1938) is an American former professional basketball player and coach. As a head coach with the Denver Nuggets in the National Basketball Association (NBA), he was named the NBA Coach of the Year in 1988.

Early life 
Born in Brooklyn, New York, Moe was a star player at the University of North Carolina where he was a two-time All-American. However, his collegiate career ended in controversy when he admitted to being associated with a point shaving scandal. Moe received $75 from fix conspirator Aaron Wagman to fly to a meeting in New Jersey, arranged by Moe's friend, conspirator Lou Brown, but Moe reportedly turned down an offer to throw games. There is no evidence that Moe was ever involved in a fix conspiracy, but his ties to the scandal blemished his reputation.

He was selected in the NBA draft in 1960 by the Detroit Pistons and again in 1961 with the Chicago Packers, but began his pro career in Italy's Lega Basket Serie A with the Pallacanestro Petrarca Padova, and later in the American Basketball Association with the New Orleans Buccaneers, Oakland Oaks, Washington Caps, Carolina Cougars and Virginia Squires. He garnered ABA All-Star honors three times in an injury-shortened five-year professional playing career.

Moe became a head coach in 1976–77, after serving as an assistant coach for the Carolina Cougars.  Moe worked behind the bench for 15 years, ten of them with the Denver Nuggets. He also had stops with the San Antonio Spurs and Philadelphia 76ers.

In Denver 
Moe began his coaching career with the Carolina Cougars in the ABA as an assistant coach to his UNC teammate Larry Brown from 1972 to 1974. He then followed Brown to Denver, where they coached the Nuggets from 1974 to 1976. During those two seasons, the Nuggets were 125–43 (.744). They advanced to the ABA Finals in 1976, but lost to the New York Nets in six games.

After the ABA–NBA merger in 1976, Moe served as a head coach for the San Antonio Spurs for four seasons (1976–80), leading them to a conference finals appearance in 1979. He returned to Denver in 1980 to take over the head coaching reins from another UNC alum, Donnie Walsh. From 1980 to 1990, Moe compiled a 432–357 (.548) record and led the Nuggets to the postseason nine-straight years—advancing as far as the Western Conference Finals in 1985. He guided the Nuggets to two Midwest Division titles (1984–85 and '87–88) and a franchise-record 54 wins in 1987–88. He was named NBA Coach of the Year that same year. Under Moe's direction, the Nuggets high-octane offense led the league in scoring in six of his 10 seasons in Denver. 

Moe announced his dismissal from the Nuggets on September 6, 1990 at a press conference where he and his wife Jane had a Champagne toast. He had three years remaining on his contract but was caught in the middle of a front-office restructure initiated by Comsat Video Enterprises, Inc. which had purchased the franchise eleven months earlier. Comsat Chief Executive Officer Robert Wussler was most critical of his coaching. Moe is honored by the Nuggets with a banner that reads "432" for his number of wins as a Nuggets' head coach.

Moe also served an unsuccessful stint as a head coach for the Philadelphia 76ers (1992–93), with his son David Moe as an assistant coach. In 1979, he led the Spurs to the conference finals. His overall NBA head coaching ledger stands at 628–529 (.543) and his wins are the 19th-most in NBA history, though he is not in the Hall of Fame.

Coaching style 
Moe used a run-and-gun offense which had his team shoot before the opponent's defense had set up. He ran almost no plays, instead relying on ball movement, screens and constant cuts to the basket. Players were not to hold onto the ball for longer than two seconds. The movement of the ball was predicated on what the defense allowed. "You can't diagram it, you can't put a pencil and paper to it. If you do, you're doing an injustice to the system", said former Nuggets assistant Allan Bristow. Moe simply said, "The passing game is basically doing whatever the hell you want."

Moe's passing strategy was adopted from North Carolina head coach Dean Smith.  Smith, normally a conservative coach, thought that the passing game could work with the right players, but he did not believe players would be smart enough to execute it at all times.

Though his offensive strategy led to high scores, Moe's Denver teams were never adept at running fast breaks. His teams at times appeared to give up baskets in order to get one. He disputed the fact that his teams did not play defense, attributing the high scores to the pace of the game.

On coming to the NBA after the NBA-ABA merger 

"One of the biggest disappointments in my life was going into the NBA after the merger.  The NBA was a rinky-dink league—listen, I'm very serious about this.  The league was run like garbage.  There was no camaraderie; a lot of the NBA guys were aloof and thought they were too good to practice or play hard.  The NBA All-Star Games were nothing—guys didn't even want to play in them and the fans could [sic] care less about the games.  It wasn't until the 1980s, when David Stern became commissioner, that the NBA figured out what the hell they were doing, and what they did was a lot of stuff we had in the ABA—from the 3-point shot to All-Star weekend to the show biz stuff.  Now the NBA is like the old ABA.  Guys play hard, they show their enthusiasm and there is a closeness in the league.  Hell, the ABA might have lost the battle, but we won the war.  The NBA now plays our kind of basketball."

Head coaching record

NBA 

|-
| style="text-align:left;"|SAS
| style="text-align:left;"|
|64||44||38||.537|| style="text-align:center;"|3rd in Central||2||0||2||.000
| style="text-align:center;"|Lost in First Round
|-
| style="text-align:left;"|SAS
| style="text-align:left;"|
|82||52||30||.634|| style="text-align:center;"|1st in Central||6||2||4||.333
| style="text-align:center;"|Lost in Conf. Semifinals
|-
| style="text-align:left;"|SAS
| style="text-align:left;"|
|82||48||34||.585|| style="text-align:center;"|1st in Central||14||7||7||.500
| style="text-align:center;"|Lost in Conf. Finals
|-
| style="text-align:left;"|SAS
| style="text-align:left;"|
|66||33||33||.500|| style="text-align:center;"|(fired)||—||—||—||—
| style="text-align:center;"|—
|-
| style="text-align:left;"|DEN
| style="text-align:left;"|
|51||26||25||.510|| style="text-align:center;"|4th in Midwest||—||—||—||—
| style="text-align:center;"|Missed Playoffs
|-
| style="text-align:left;"|DEN
| style="text-align:left;"|
|82||46||36||.561|| style="text-align:center;"|2nd in Midwest||3||1||2||.333
| style="text-align:center;"|Lost in First Round
|-
| style="text-align:left;"|DEN
| style="text-align:left;"|
|82||45||37||.549|| style="text-align:center;"|2nd in Midwest||8||3||5||.375
| style="text-align:center;"|Lost in Conf. Semifinals
|-
| style="text-align:left;"|DEN
| style="text-align:left;"|
|82||38||44||.463|| style="text-align:center;"|3rd in Midwest||5||2||3||.400
| style="text-align:center;"|Lost in First Round
|-
| style="text-align:left;"|DEN
| style="text-align:left;"|
|82||52||30||.634|| style="text-align:center;"|1st in Midwest||15||8||7||.533
| style="text-align:center;"|Lost in Conf. Finals
|-
| style="text-align:left;"|DEN
| style="text-align:left;"|
|82||47||35||.573|| style="text-align:center;"|2nd in Midwest||10||5||5||.500
| style="text-align:center;"|Lost in Conf. Semifinals
|-
| style="text-align:left;"|DEN
| style="text-align:left;"|
|82||37||45||.451|| style="text-align:center;"|4th in Midwest||3||0||3||.000
| style="text-align:center;"|Lost in First Round
|-
| style="text-align:left;"|DEN
| style="text-align:left;"|
|82||54||28||.659|| style="text-align:center;"|1st in Midwest||11||5||6||.455
| style="text-align:center;"|Lost in Conf. Semifinals
|-
| style="text-align:left;"|DEN
| style="text-align:left;"|
|82||44||38||.537|| style="text-align:center;"|3rd in Midwest||3||0||3||.000
| style="text-align:center;"|Lost in First Round
|-
| style="text-align:left;"|DEN
| style="text-align:left;"|
|82||43||39||.524|| style="text-align:center;"|4th in Midwest||3||0||3||.000
| style="text-align:center;"|Lost in First Round
|-
| style="text-align:left;"|PHI
| style="text-align:left;"|
|56||19||37||.339|| style="text-align:center;"|(fired)||—||—||—||—
| style="text-align:center;"|—
|- class="sortbottom"
| style="text-align:left;"|Career
| ||1157||628||529||.543|| ||83||33||50||.398

See also

References

External links 

 Basketball-Reference.com: Doug Moe (as coach) 
 Basketball-Reference.com: Doug Moe (as player)

1938 births
Living people
All-American college men's basketball players
American expatriate basketball people in Italy
American men's basketball players
Basketball coaches from New York (state)
Basketball players from New York City
Carolina Cougars coaches
Carolina Cougars players
Chicago Packers draft picks
Denver Nuggets assistant coaches
Denver Nuggets head coaches
Detroit Pistons draft picks
New Orleans Buccaneers players
North Carolina Tar Heels men's basketball players
Oakland Oaks players
Pallacanestro Petrarca Padova players
Philadelphia 76ers head coaches
San Antonio Spurs head coaches
Small forwards
Sportspeople from Brooklyn
Virginia Squires players
Washington Caps players